Patrick Patterson (born March 14, 1989) is an American film producer and former professional basketball player. He played in the NBA for the Houston Rockets, Sacramento Kings, Toronto Raptors, Oklahoma City Thunder, and Los Angeles Clippers.

Early life
Patterson, born in Washington, D.C., grew up in Huntington, West Virginia and graduated from Huntington High School in 2007. During his high school career, Patterson helped lead Huntington High School to three-straight state championships. Patterson won his third state championship during his senior season with help from O. J. Mayo.

Considered a five-star recruit by Rivals.com, Patterson was listed as the No. 3 power forward and the No. 17 player in the nation in 2007, and was named a McDonald's All-American.

College career
Patrick Patterson played college basketball for the University of Kentucky. He chose to play for Kentucky rather than Duke or Florida in a highly publicized recruiting battle. He was recruited by Kentucky coach Tubby Smith and his replacement Billy Gillispie. In the 2009–10 season he played for former Memphis coach John Calipari who became Billy Gillispie's replacement in April 2009.

Freshman season
During Patterson's freshman All-American 2007–08 season, he averaged 16.4 points, 7.7 rebounds, 1.2 blocks and 0.8 steals, while shooting 57% from the field. After a Kentucky victory over the Ole Miss Rebels, Patterson missed the remainder of the 2007–08 season with a stress fracture in his left ankle. He also claimed he planned on staying at Kentucky rather than participating in the NBA draft.

Sophomore season

For his sophomore season at UK during the 2008–09 season, he and teammate Jodie Meeks became one of the most successful duos that season, and also became the most productive duo at Kentucky, since the days of Dan Issel and Mike Pratt. Patterson scored a career-high 33 points on December 22, 2008 against the Tennessee State Tigers. During Patterson's sophomore 2008–09 season, he averaged 17.9 points, 9.3 rebounds, 2.1 blocks and 0.6 steals, while shooting 60% from the field. On April 18, 2009, Patterson decided to enter his name into the 2009 NBA draft. However, on May 8, 2009, Patrick decided he would return to Kentucky for the third season.

Junior season
Patterson continued to play a crucial role for the team during his junior season. However, with the addition of freshman players John Wall, DeMarcus Cousins and Eric Bledsoe, Patterson was no longer required to be the main option for scoring and rebounding. Patterson also improved his outside shot, shooting about 35% from the 3-point line all season (compared to no 3-pointers made in the previous seasons). During this season, Patterson helped the team win the SEC tournament and achieve a #1 seed in the NCAA Tournament for the first time since 2004. On April 23, 2010, Patterson entered the 2010 NBA draft; by the time of the draft, he had completed his coursework and earned a degree from UK.

Professional career

Houston Rockets (2010–2013)

On June 24, 2010, Patterson was selected in the NBA draft by the Houston Rockets with the fourteenth overall pick. On November 10, he was assigned to the Rio Grande Valley Vipers of the NBA Development League. In nine games with the Vipers, Patterson averaged 35 minutes, 18.3 points, and 10.3 rebounds. Two days after being recalled by the Rockets, he made his NBA regular season debut on December 15, 2010.

With Luis Scola injured, Patterson had his first NBA start with the Rockets on March 14, 2011, scoring 2 points and grabbing 5 rebounds.

After the Rockets used the amnesty clause to waive Scola, Patterson became the starting power forward for the 2012-13 season.

Sacramento Kings (2013)
On February 20, 2013, Patterson was traded to the Sacramento Kings along with Toney Douglas and Cole Aldrich in exchange for Thomas Robinson, Francisco García and Tyler Honeycutt.

Toronto Raptors (2013–2017)
On December 9, 2013, the Kings traded Patterson, along with Greivis Vásquez, John Salmons, and Chuck Hayes to the Toronto Raptors for Rudy Gay, Quincy Acy, and Aaron Gray.

On July 12, 2014, Patterson re-signed with the Raptors to a reported three-year, $18 million contract.

Oklahoma City Thunder (2017–2019)
On July 10, 2017, Patterson signed with the Oklahoma City Thunder. On August 10, 2017, he underwent a successful arthroscopic procedure on his left knee. On August 1, 2019, Patterson and the Thunder agreed to a buyout, allowing him to become an unrestricted free agent.

Los Angeles Clippers (2019–2021)
On August 16, 2019, Patterson signed with the Los Angeles Clippers.

On September 23, 2021, Patterson signed with the Portland Trail Blazers. However, he was waived on October 16, after two preseason games.

Career statistics

NBA

Regular season

|-
| style="text-align:left;"| 
| style="text-align:left;"| Houston
| 52 || 6 || 16.7 || .558 || .000 || .714 || 3.8 || .8 || .3 || .7 || 6.3
|-
| style="text-align:left;"| 
| style="text-align:left;"| Houston
| 64 || 1 || 23.2 || .440 || .000 || .702 || 4.5 || .8 || .4 || .6 || 7.7
|-
| style="text-align:left;"| 
| style="text-align:left;"| Houston
| 47 || 38 || 25.9 || .519 || .365 || .755 || 4.7 || 1.1 || .4 || .6 || 11.6
|-
| style="text-align:left;"| 
| style="text-align:left;"| Sacramento
| 24 || 3 || 23.2 || .494 || .444 || .786 || 4.8 || 1.3 || .5 || .5 || 8.0
|-
| style="text-align:left;" | 
| style="text-align:left;" | Sacramento
| 17 || 6 || 24.4 || .410 || .231 || .563 || 5.8 || .9 || .8 || .2 || 6.9
|-
| style="text-align:left;" | 
| style="text-align:left;" | Toronto
| 48 || 7 || 23.3 || .477 || .411 || .745 || 5.1 || 1.3 || .9 || .7 || 9.1
|-
| style="text-align:left;" | 
| style="text-align:left;" | Toronto
| 81 || 4 || 26.6 || .449 || .371 || .788 || 5.3 || 1.9 || .7 || .5 || 8.0
|-
| style="text-align:left;" | 
| style="text-align:left;" | Toronto
| 79 || 0 || 25.6 || .414 || .362 || .853 || 4.3 || 1.2 || .7 || .4 || 6.9
|-
| style="text-align:left;" | 
| style="text-align:left;" | Toronto
| 65 || 8 || 24.6 || .401 || .372 || .717  || 4.5 || 1.2 || .6 || .4 || 6.8
|-
| style="text-align:left;" | 
| style="text-align:left;" | Oklahoma City
| 82 || 3 || 15.5 || .398 || .386 || .870  || 2.4 || .7 || .6 || .3 || 3.9
|-
| style="text-align:left;" | 
| style="text-align:left;" | Oklahoma City
| 63 || 5 || 13.7 || .374 || .336 || .633  || 2.3 || .5 || .3 || .2 || 3.6
|-
| style="text-align:left;" | 
| style="text-align:left;" | L.A. Clippers
| 59 || 18 || 13.2 || .408 || .390 || .814  || 2.6 || .7 || .1 || .1 || 4.9
|-
| style="text-align:left;" | 
| style="text-align:left;" | L.A. Clippers
| 38 || 5 || 15.3 || .436 || .357 || .765 || 2.0 || .8 || .4 || .2 || 5.2
|- class="sortbottom"
| style="text-align:center;" colspan="2"| Career
| 719 || 104 || 20.8 || .447 || .369 || .755 || 3.9 || 1.0 || .5 || .4 || 6.7

Playoffs

|-
| align="left" | 2014
| align="left" | Toronto
| 7 || 0 || 28.4 || .542 || .389 || .778 || 6.7 || 1.3 || .4 || .4 || 10.4
|-
| align="left" | 2015
| align="left" | Toronto
| 4 || 1 || 26.5 || .556 || .467 || 1.000 || 3.5 || 1.3 || .8 || .0 || 10.3
|-
| align="left" | 2016
| align="left" | Toronto
| 20 || 9 || 29.2 || .404 || .300 || .846 || 3.9 || 1.2 || .4 || .5 || 7.7
|-
| align="left" | 2017
| align="left" | Toronto
| 10 || 1 || 18.5 || .278 || .308 || 1.000 || 2.0 || 2.0 || .7 || .2 || 3.4
|-
| align="left" | 2018
| align="left" | Oklahoma City
| 6 || 0 || 9.6 || .500 || .500 || – || 1.8 || .5 || .2 || .0 || 1.3
|-
| align="left" | 2020
| align="left" | L.A. Clippers
| 2 || 0 || 5.0 || 1.000 || 1.000 || – || .5 || 2.0 || .0 || .0 || 4.5
|- class="sortbottom"
| style="text-align:center;" colspan="2"| Career
| 49 || 10 || 23.3 || .438 || .353 || .852 || 3.5 || 1.3 || .4 || .3 || 6.5

College

|-
| style="text-align:left;"| 2007–08
| style="text-align:left;"| Kentucky
| 25 || 25 || 35.7 || .574 || .000 || .731 || 7.7 || 1.7 || .8 || 1.2 || 16.4
|-
| style="text-align:left;"| 2008–09
| style="text-align:left;"| Kentucky
| 34 || 34 || 33.6 || .603 || .000 || .768 || 9.3 || 2.0 || .6 || 2.1 || 17.9
|-
| style="text-align:left;"| 2009–10
| style="text-align:left;"| Kentucky
| 38 || 38 || 33.0 || .575 || .348 || .692 || 7.4 || .9 || .7 || 1.3 || 14.3
|- class="sortbottom"
| style="text-align:center;" colspan="2"| Career
| 97 || 97 || 34.0 || .604 || .329 || .734 || 8.2 || 1.5 || .7 || 1.6 || 16.1

Film career 
On October 19, 2021, Patterson and Joel Reilly launched Undisputed Pictures, a film company.

References

External links

Kentucky Wildcats bio

1989 births
Living people
African-American basketball players
American expatriate basketball people in Canada
American men's basketball players
Basketball players from Washington, D.C.
Basketball players from West Virginia
Centers (basketball)
Houston Rockets draft picks
Houston Rockets players
Kentucky Wildcats men's basketball players
Los Angeles Clippers players
McDonald's High School All-Americans
Oklahoma City Thunder players
Parade High School All-Americans (boys' basketball)
Power forwards (basketball)
Rio Grande Valley Vipers players
Sacramento Kings players
Sportspeople from Huntington, West Virginia
Toronto Raptors players
21st-century African-American sportspeople
20th-century African-American people
Huntington High School (West Virginia) alumni